Market Weighton railway station was a railway station at the junction of the Selby to Driffield and York to Beverley lines in the East Riding of Yorkshire, England.

History

It opened on 4 October 1847 and served the town of Market Weighton. The overall roof of the station was removed in 1947 and replaced with steel awnings. It closed after the last train ran on 27 November 1965, and the station buildings were demolished in 1979.

Station Masters

Thomas Lazenby
Henry Goldsbrough ???? – 1902 (afterwards station master at Ripon)
William Gill 1902 – 1903 (formerly station master at Hutton Cranswick)
C. Horner 1903 – 1909 (formerly station master at Haxby)
William J. Chapman 1909 – 1920 (afterwards station master at Driffield)
T. Horsley 1920 – 1925
M. W. Scott 1925 – 1931
H. Hornby 1931 – 1940
Richard Tyreman 1940 – 1944
S. Wilkinson 1944 – ????
Frederick George Saunders 1948 – 1957
W. W. Dixon 1957 – ???? (formerly station master at Middleton on the Wold)
R. S. Jones 1961 –

References

External links

Market Weighton station on navigable 1947 O.S. map

Buildings and structures demolished in 1979
Disused railway stations in the East Riding of Yorkshire
Former York and North Midland Railway stations
Beeching closures in England
Railway stations in Great Britain opened in 1847
Railway stations in Great Britain closed in 1965
1847 establishments in England
George Townsend Andrews railway stations
1965 disestablishments in England
Market Weighton